Lights Out is the debut solo album by Peter Wolf, released in 1984. The album was dedicated "to the memory of Edith Marie Hasselman and Edward Mant Hood".

Track listing
"Lights Out" (Don Covay, Wolf) - 4:27
"I Need You Tonight" (Peter Bliss, Wolf) - 3:39
"Oo-Ee-Diddley-Bop!" (Michael Jonzun, Wolf, Gordon Worthy) - 4:13
"Gloomy Sunday" (László Jávor, Sam M. Lewis, Rezső Seress) - 3:37
"Baby Please Don't Let Me Go" (Michael Jonzun, Maurice Starr, Wolf) - 4:02
"Crazy" (Michael Jonzun, Wolf) - 3:49
"Poor Girl's Heart" (Michael Jonzun, Wolf) - 3:04
"Here Comes That Hurt" (Michael Jonzun, Wolf) - 3:14
"Pretty Lady" (Michael Jonzun, Wolf) - 3:44
"Mars Needs Women" (Michael Jonzun, Wolf) - 2:41
"Billy Bigtime" (Michael Jonzun, Tim Mayer, Wolf) - 4:40

Personnel
Peter Wolf - congas, vocals, backing vocals
Robin Beck - backing vocals on "Lights Out"
Adrian Belew - guitar
Peter Bliss - guitar, backing vocals
Tony "Rocks" Cowan - guitar
Alan Dawson - percussion
Elliot Easton - guitar
Eddie Gorodetsky - narrator on "Mars Needs Women"
Yogi Horton - percussion
Mick Jagger - backing vocals on "Pretty Lady"
Michael Jonzun - bass, flute, guitar, percussion, congas, horn, keyboards, backing vocals
Will Lee - bass, vocals, backing vocals
Leon Mobley - conductor, congas
P-Funk Horns - horn section
Rick "Rice" Peppers - guitar
Elliott Randall - guitar
Randy Roos - guitar
G.E. Smith - guitar on "Pretty Lady"
Maurice Starr - bass, guitar, backing vocals
Ed Stasium - guitar, percussion
Rusty "The Toe-Jammer" Pendleton - scratches on "Oo-Ee-Diddley-Bop"
Skeeter Singletary - scratches on "Oo-Ee-Diddley-Bop"
Gordon Worthy - bass, conga, keyboard, backing vocals

Production
Producers: Peter Wolf, Michael Jonzun
Engineer: Ed Stasium
Mixing assistant: Billy Miranda
Studio assistants: Sidney Burton, Calvin Johnson, Tom Moore
Assistant: Gordon Worthy
Arrangers: Peter Wolf, Michael Jonzun
Art direction: Carin Goldberg, Henry Marquez
Design: Carin Goldberg, Henry Marquez
Logo design: Michael Diehl
Photography: Carol Friedman, Ron Pownall
Cover photo: Chris Callis

Charts

Notes 

Peter Wolf albums
1984 debut albums
EMI America Records albums
Albums produced by Michael Jonzun